Paramenthane hydroperoxide (PMHP) is an organic peroxide with a distinctive odor. It is used on an industrial scale as a polymerization initiator for emulsion polymerizations. It is usually sold in a light yellow liquid solutions of about 50% strength.

References 

Organic peroxides
Monoterpenes